The 2012 Toppserien was the twenty-sixth season of top-tier women's football in Norway since its establishment in 1987. A total of 12 teams contested the league, ten returning from the 2011 season and the two teams promoted from the First Division, Vålerenga and Fart.

The season started on 14 April 2012.

Changes from 2011
 Norway fell from 8th to 11th in the UEFA coefficient rankings for the 2013–14 European season. Thus the runners-up is no longer qualified to the Champions League.
 The eleventh placed teams will play a promotion/relegation play-off against the second league's second-place finisher. A play-off was last played in 2006.

Teams

League table

Relegation play-offs
Kattem had to face second league's second-place finisher Medkila in a two-legged play-off match for the right to play in the 2013 Toppserien. Kattem won the playoff, but subsequently withdrew their team from the league. Medkila were promoted to take their place in Toppserien.

Top goalscorers

References

External links
Season on soccerway.com

Toppserien seasons
Top level Norwegian women's football league seasons
Norway
Norway
1